Othmar Hermann Ammann (March 26, 1879 – September 22, 1965) was a Swiss-American civil engineer whose bridge designs include the George Washington Bridge, Verrazzano-Narrows Bridge, and Bayonne Bridge.  He also directed the planning and construction of the Lincoln Tunnel.

Biography

Othmar Ammann was born near Schaffhausen, Switzerland, in 1879. His father was a manufacturer and his mother was a hat maker. He received his engineering education at the Polytechnikum in Zürich, Switzerland. He studied with Swiss engineer Wilhelm Ritter. In 1904, he emigrated to the United States, spending much of his career working in New York City. He became a naturalized citizen in 1924.

In 1905 he briefly returned to Switzerland to marry Lilly Selma Wehrli. Together they had three children Werner, George, and Margotbefore she died in 1933. He then married Klary Vogt Noetzli, herself recently widowed, in 1935 in California.

Ammann wrote two reports about bridge collapses, the collapse of the Quebec Bridge and the collapse of the original Tacoma Narrows Bridge (Galloping Gertie). It was the report that he wrote about the failure of the Quebec Bridge in 1907 that first earned him recognition in the field of bridge design engineering. Because of this report, he was able to obtain a position working for Gustav Lindenthal on the Hell Gate Bridge. By 1925, he had been appointed bridge engineer to the Port of New York Authority. His design for a bridge over the Hudson River was accepted over one developed by his mentor, Lindenthal. (Lindenthal's "North River Bridge" designs show an enormous, 16+ lane bridge that would have accommodated pedestrians, freight trains, rapid transit, and automobile traffic. The bridge, which would have entered Manhattan at 57th Street, was rejected in favor of Ammann's designs primarily due to cost reasons.)

Ultimately, this became the George Washington Bridge. Under Ammann's direction, it was completed six months ahead of schedule for less than the original $60 million budget. Ammann's designs for the George Washington Bridge, and, later, the Bayonne Bridge, caught the attention of master builder Robert Moses, who drafted Ammann into his service. The last four of Ammann's six New York City bridges — Triborough, Bronx-Whitestone, Throgs Neck, and Verrazzano-Narrows Bridge were all built for Moses' Triborough Bridge and Tunnel Authority. In 1946, Ammann and Charles Whitney founded the firm Ammann & Whitney. The Verrazzano-Narrows Bridge is currently the eleventh-longest span in the world and longest in the Western Hemisphere. Ammann also assisted in the building of the Golden Gate Bridge in San Francisco, currently ranked twelfth.

Works
Ammann was known for being able to create bridges that were light and inexpensive, yet they were still simple and beautiful. He was able to do this by using the deflection theory. He believed that the weight per foot of the span and the cables would provide enough stiffness so that the bridge would not need any stiffening trusses. This made him popular during the depression era when being able to reduce the cost was crucial. Famous bridges by Ammann include the following:
George Washington Bridge (opened October 24, 1931)
Bayonne Bridge (opened November 15, 1931)
Triborough Bridge (opened July 11, 1936)
Bronx–Whitestone Bridge (opened April 29, 1939)
Delaware Memorial Bridge (with HNTB, first span opened 1951)
Walt Whitman Bridge (opened May 16, 1957)
Throgs Neck Bridge (opened January 11, 1961)
Verrazzano-Narrows Bridge (opened November 21, 1964)

The George Washington Bridge was originally designed to have its steel structure clad in dressed stone, omitted from the final design due to cost constraints stemming from the Great Depression. Ammann's managerial skills saw the bridge completed ahead of schedule and under budget.

The arched Bayonne Bridge is the only Othmar design that is not a suspension bridge.

The Bronx-Whitestone Bridge had to be reinforced after only one year of operation because of perceptible movement during high winds. Warren trusses were initially implemented to stiffen the bridge, spoiling its classic streamlined looks. They have been removed and the wind problem solved using triangular shaped lightweight fiberglass aerodynamic fairing along both sides that slices the wind as it passes over the bridge.

In addition to his work on bridges, Ammann also directed the planning and construction of the Lincoln Tunnel.

Legacy
Ammann was the recipient of several awards, including the Thomas Fitch Rowland Prize (1919), the Metropolitan Section Civil Engineer of the Year (1958), the Ernest E. Howard Award (1960) and the National Medal of Science (1964).

In 1962, a bronze bust of Ammann was unveiled in the lobby of the George Washington Bridge Bus Station. A residence hall called Ammann College was dedicated in his honor on February 18, 1968 on the campus of Stony Brook University. To mark the hundredth anniversary of his birth, a memorial plaque for Ammann was placed near the Verrazzano Narrows Bridge on June 28, 1979.

See also 
 Austin Tobin
 Robert Moses
 Eugenius Harvey Outerbridge
 Christopher O. Ward

References

Further reading 

 https://www.nae.edu/MembersSection/51314/51355.aspx
 Engines of Our Ingenuity. (Radio program.) Episode No. 698. University of Houston, Texas.

External links 

Ammann & Whitney 
 
Othmar Ammann’s Glory: Genius, willpower and thousands of miles of steel wire went into the George Washington Bridge
Othmar Ammann's Glory: A description of the design of the George Washington Bridge and Ammann's rivalry with Lindenthal
Othmar Ammann: Provides dates of death, election to the academy, and citation
Photo

Othmar Ammann: Facts and Quotes from ASCE

1879 births
1965 deaths
Bridge engineers
ETH Zurich alumni
Swiss emigrants to the United States
Swiss civil engineers
Structural engineers
National Medal of Science laureates
People from Feuerthalen